Rhun ap Iorwerth (born 27 August 1972) is a Welsh journalist and politician serving as the Deputy Leader of Plaid Cymru since 2018. He has been the Member of the Senedd (MS) for Ynys Môn since 2013.

Early and personal life
Born in Tonteg, he was educated at Ysgol Rhyd-y-Main and Ysgol Gynradd Llandegfan before going to Ysgol David Hughes in Menai Bridge. He studied politics and Welsh at Cardiff University.

He is married with three children, he and his family reside on the island of Anglesey.

Career
In 1994, he joined BBC Cymru Wales, and worked as a journalist at BBC Westminster. Returning to Wales after the 1997 devolution referendum, he became BBC Wales' Chief Political Correspondent in 2001, a post he held for five years, before moving into presenting roles. He has been presenter of The Politics Show Wales, Dragon's Eye, ampm, BBC Radio Wales' Good Morning Wales, BBC Radio Cymru's Post Cyntaf breakfast news programme and weekly political discussion programme Dau o'r Bae, and the BBC's main evening news programme for S4C Newyddion. He has also been a regular correspondent for BBC Network news, featuring on all BBC News channels. Outside news, he has presented numerous series for S4C, including its coverage of the National Eisteddfod, Y Rhufeiniaid, and arts series Pethe.

In January 2012, he was announced as one of the patrons of the Cronfa Betsi Fund, the charitable arm of the Betsi Cadwaladr University Health Board.

Political career

On 20 June 2013, former Plaid Cymru leader Ieuan Wyn Jones resigned from the National Assembly for Wales seat in order to take a post leading the new Menai Science Park, triggering a by-election in the constituency.

After gaining special dispensation from the Plaid national executive committee (as a serving political journalist, he could not nominally be a member of a political party and Plaid Cymru rules stipulated that candidates had to have been a member for 12 months), he was accepted as a nominee, and immediately stepped down from his role at BBC Cymru Wales on 26 June.

The by-election provoked a local debate, in which Wylfa Nuclear Power Station became a key issue. The by-election was seen as key – had Welsh Labour won then they would have had an outright majority in the Assembly with 31 out of the 60 seats. The election on 1 August 2013 saw ap Iorwerth gain 12,601 votes, over the second-placed candidate Tal Michael (Labour), on a turnout of 42.45%. Ap Iorwerth held his seat in 2016 and in 2018 unsuccessfully ran for the leadership of Plaid Cymru. He was later appointed as joint deputy leader.

Ap Iorwerth has served as Plaid Cymru's spokesperson (Shadow Minister) for Economy and Transport and currently serves as their Shadow Minister for Health and Finance.

In July 2022, he announced his candidacy to become Plaid Cymru's prospective parliamentary candidate in Ynys Môn for the next British general election.

References

External links

Plaid Cymru website

1972 births
Living people
BBC Cymru Wales newsreaders and journalists
Plaid Cymru members of the Senedd
People educated at Ysgol David Hughes
Wales AMs 2011–2016
Wales MSs 2016–2021
Wales MSs 2021–2026
Welsh-speaking politicians